Osthausen-Wülfershausen is a municipality in the district Ilm-Kreis, in Thuringia, Germany.

References

Municipalities in Thuringia
Ilm-Kreis
Schwarzburg-Sondershausen